Slavko Vučković (Serbian Cyrillic: Cлaвкo Bучкoвић, born 5 August 1982) is a Serbian footballer who plays for Ararat Yerevan.

External sources
 Profile at Armenian Federation site.
 Profile at FootballWorldsgame.

1982 births
Living people
Serbian footballers
Serbian expatriate footballers
FK Spartak Subotica players
FC Ararat Yerevan players
Armenian Premier League players
Expatriate footballers in Armenia
Association football forwards